Rosser Lynn Malone Jr. (September 9, 1910 – August 13, 1974) was an American attorney who served as United States Deputy Attorney General from 1952 to 1953.

References

External links

1910 births
1974 deaths
United States Deputy Attorneys General
New Mexico Democrats
People from Roswell, New Mexico
Washington and Lee University School of Law alumni